Pic la Selle (Kreyòl: Pik Lasel), also called Morne La Selle, is the highest peak in Haiti with a height of  above sea level. The mountain is part of the Chaîne de la Selle mountain range.  It is located in the Ouest administrative department.

References

External links
 "Pic La Selle" on Summitpost.org

Mountains of Haiti
Mountains of the Caribbean
Highest points of countries